SS Charles W. Stiles was a Liberty ship built in the United States during World War II. She was named after Charles W. Stiles, a parasitologist and zoologist at the Bureau of Animal Industry in the U.S. Department of Agriculture (1891–1902), who was later chief zoologist at the Hygienic Laboratory of the US Public Health and Marine Hospital Service (1902–1931).

Construction
Charles W. Stiles was laid down on 9 September 1944, under a Maritime Commission (MARCOM) contract, MC hull 2380, by J.A. Jones Construction, Brunswick, Georgia; she was sponsored by Mrs. P.O. Murphy,  and launched on 18 October 1944.

History
She was allocated to Seas Shipping Co. Inc., on 31 October 1944. On 28 February 1947, she was sold for $562,260.11 to Global Transport Ltd., for commercial use. She was reflagged for Panama, and renamed Bygdin.

References

Bibliography

 
 
 
 
 

 

Liberty ships
Ships built in Brunswick, Georgia
1944 ships